The 1929 English Dirt Track League was the inaugural season of speedway in the United Kingdom for Northern English teams. There was also a Southern League called the 1929 Speedway Southern League that started during the same year.

Summary
The season was littered with mid-season withdrawals but eventually the Leeds were crowned champions. In 1930, the league was renamed the Northern League so the league existed for just one year. White City Speedway (Manchester) withdrew from the league after a dispute and would have been crowned champions if they had not done so because they were leading the table at the time. 

Dennis Atkinson suffered critical injuries on 12 July 1929, following an accident at Cleveland Park Stadium riding in a Golden Helmet meeting. He died the following day.

Final table

Withdrawals (Records expunged) : 
Belle Vue Aces
Bolton
Burnley
Hanley
Long Eaton
White City Speedway (Manchester)
Warrington

Top Five Riders

English Dirt Track Knockout Cup

First round

Second round

Semifinals

Final

First leg

Second leg

Preston were Knockout Cup winners, winning on aggregate 87–39.

See also
 List of United Kingdom Speedway League Champions

References

Speedway Northern League
1929_in_speedway